The Cabinet Secretary for the Constitution, External Affairs and Culture, commonly referred to as the Constitution Secretary, is a cabinet position in the Scottish Government. The Cabinet Secretary is supported by the Minister for Culture, Europe and International Development.

The current Cabinet Secretary for the Constitution, External Affairs and Culture is Angus Robertson, who assumed office in May 2021.

History
The United Kingdom European Union membership referendum took place on 23 June 2016. This position was established (initially as "Minister for UK Negotiations on Scotland's Place in Europe") so that the Scottish government would be involved in the development of the UK government's position before the Prime Minister triggered Article 50.

During a Scottish Government reshuffle in June 2018, the post was promoted to the Cabinet and renamed Cabinet Secretary for Government Business and Constitutional Relations. It was further renamed to Cabinet Secretary for the Constitution, Europe and External Affairs in February 2020.

Overview

Responsibilities
The responsibilities of the Cabinet Secretary for the Constitution, External Affairs and Culture include:

 independence
 cross-government co-ordination of European and external relations
 policy in relation to UK's exit from the EU
 post-Brexit relations
 migration
 Scottish diaspora
 Global Affairs Network
 Scottish Cities of Refuge
 New Scot strategy
 culture policy
 broadcasting and screen
 National Records of Scotland
 Registers of Scotland
 British Irish Council
 royal and ceremonial

Public bodies
The following public bodies report to the Cabinet Secretary for the Constitution, External Affairs and Culture :
 Architecture and Design Scotland
 Creative Scotland
 Historic Environment Scotland
 National Galleries of Scotland
 National Library of Scotland
 National Museums of Scotland
 Visitscotland

List of office holders

See also
Scottish Parliament
Scottish Government
Secretary of State for Exiting the European Union

References

External links 
Minister for UK Negotiations on Scotland's Place in Europe on Scottish Government website
The Scottish Cabinet on Scottish Government website

Government Business and Constitutional Relations
Brexit
Foreign relations of Scotland
2016 establishments in Scotland